David Samuel Margoliouth, FBA (17 October 1858, in London – 22 March 1940, in London) was an English orientalist. He was briefly active as a priest in the Church of England. He was Laudian Professor of Arabic at the University of Oxford from 1889 to 1937.

Life
His father, Ezekiel, had converted from Judaism to Anglicanism, and thereafter worked in Bethnal Green as a missionary to the Jews; he was also close to his uncle, the Anglican convert Moses Margoliouth. Margoliouth was educated at Winchester College, where he was a scholar, and at New College, Oxford where he graduated with a double first  Bachelor of Arts (BA) in literae humaniores in 1880: he won an unprecedented number of prizes in Classics and Oriental languages, of which he had mastered Arabic, Persian, Turkish, Armenian and Syriac, in addition to Hebrew. His academic dissertation, published in 1888, was entitled Analecta Orientalia ad Poeticam Aristoteleam.  In 1889, he succeeded to the Laudian Chair of Arabic, a position he held until he retired, from ill health, in 1937. He received the degree Doctor of Letters (D.Litt.) from New College in July 1902.

Many of his works on the history of Islam became the standard treatises in English, including Mohammed and the Rise of Islam (1905), The Early Development of Mohammedanism (1914), and The Relations Between Arabs and Israelites Prior to the Rise of Islam (1924).

He was described as a brilliant editor and translator of Arabic works, as seen in The Letters of Abu'l-'Ala of Ma'arrat al-Nu'man (1898), Yaqut's Dictionary of Learned Men, 6 vol. (1907–27), and the chronicle of Miskawayh, prepared in collaboration with H. F. Amedroz under the title The Eclipse of the 'Abbasid Caliphate, 7 vol. (1920–21).

He identified a business letter written in the Judeo-Persian language, found in Dandan Uiliq, northwest China, in 1901, as dating from 718 C.E. (the earliest evidence showing the presence of Jews in China).

He was a member of the council of the Royal Asiatic Society from 1905 onwards, its director in 1927, was awarded its triennial gold medal in 1928, and was its president 1934–37.

Egyptian Poet Laureate Ahmed Shawqi dedicated his famous poem, The Nile, to Margoliouth.

Margoliouth on the Pre-Islamic Arabic Poetry

An article written in a polemical tone speaks of D.S. Margoliouth's "fabulous conspiracy theor[y]"; an "(in)famous theory" that "the poems we know of as pre-Islamic were actual forgeries of a later Islamic period."

Similarly, the Pakistani Islamic scholar Javed Ghamidi spoke of "the recent campaign to cast aspersions on the relevance and reliability of the whole corpus of classical Arabic literature of the Jahiliyyah period which began with 'Usul al-Shu‘ara al-'Arabi' by the famous orientalist D.S. Margoliouth..."

However, a look at D.S. Margoliouth's own writings on Pre-Islamic Arabic poetry reveals that his views were not so black and white as has been claimed in, for instance, the above-mentioned examples, but in fact, had shades of gray which indicate scholarly caution and reserve in the face of paucity of data.

In his Mohammed and the Rise of Islam (1st Edition, G. P. Putnam's Sons: New York etc., 1905), Margoliouth wrote: "The language of the Koran was thought by experts to bear a striking likeness to that of the early poetry: and though for us it is difficult to pass an opinion on this point, seeing that the early poetry is largely fabrication modelled on the Koran, we may accept the opinion of the Arabs." (p. 60)

In an article in the Encyclopaedia of Religion and Ethics (Edinburgh: T. & T. Clark, 1915), Margoliouth writes: "The relation of this Qur'anic style to the verse and rhymed prose of classical Arabic is an enigma which cannot at present be solved." (Vol. VIII, p. 874)

Personal life
On 5 April 1896, Margoliouth married Jessie Payne Smith (1856–1933), daughter of Robert Payne Smith. Jessie was a Syriac scholar and campaigner for women's suffrage.

Margoliouth was ordained in the Church of England as a deacon and as a priest in  1899, during services at Liverpool Cathedral: this was unusual as the ordinations to the diaconate and priesthood normally occurred in successive years. He never held a parochial post, and instead his title was his fellowship at New College, Oxford. Additionally, from 1899 to 1903, he was an examining chaplain to the Bishop of Liverpool. He occasionally preached at Oxford churches. He belonged to the low church wing of the Church of England, and had "extreme evangelistic tendencies".

Publications

 Lines of Defence of the Biblical Revelation; Hodder and Stoughton, 1900; 2nd ed. 1901.
Abu 'l-ʿAla al-Maʿarri's correspondence on vegetarianism, Journal of the Royal Asiatic Society, 1902, p. 289, by D. S. Margoliouth
 Mohammed and the Rise of Islam. New York and London: Putnam, 1905.
  "A poem attributed to Al-Samau’al." in: Journal of the Royal Asiatic Society. London, 1906
 Umayyads and 'Abbasids. 1907.
 The Early Development of Mohammedanism, London: Williams & Norgate, 1914.
 Irshad al-Arib ala Ma'rifat al-Adib of Yaqut al-Hamawi, (Yaqut's Dictionary of Learned Men); 7 vols., ("E. J. W. Gibb Memorial Series," Vol.VI.), Leiden, Brill, 1907–1927. (Arabic text) archive.org
 The Poetics of Aristotle; translated from Greek into English and from Arabic into Latin. (Hodder and Stoughton, 1911 )
 The Kitab al-Ansab of ʿAbd al-Karīm ibn Muḥammad al-Sam'ani. Leyden: E. J. Brill, 1912.
 Mohammedanism. London: Williams and Norgate, 1911. rev. ed. 1912
 The Table-talk of a Mesopotamian Judge. 2 vols. 1921–1922.
 The Eclipse of the Abbasid Caliphate. 1921.
 The Relations Between Arabs and Israelites Prior to the Rise of Islam. Schweich Lecture for 1921. 1924.
 Lectures on Arabic Historians, delivered before the University of Calcutta, February 1929. Byzantine series, 38. Calcutta, 1930 (later reprint: New York City: Burt Franklin).
 Catalogue of Arabic Papyri in the John Rylands Library, Manchester. Manchester, 1933

See also

Orientalism

References

External links

Britannica online article
on-line (pdf) versions of five of his works at muhammadanism.org

1858 births
1940 deaths
People educated at Winchester College
Alumni of New College, Oxford
19th-century British people
20th-century British people
19th-century English Anglican priests
English orientalists
Translators from Arabic
Christian Hebraists
British historians of Islam
Christian scholars of Islam
English Arabists
Presidents of the Royal Asiatic Society
Laudian Professors of Arabic
English people of Jewish descent
Jewish Chinese history
20th-century translators
Fellows of the British Academy